The Borgo Press was a small publishing company founded by Robert Reginald in 1975 funded by the royalties gained from his first major reference work, Stella Nova: the contemporary science fiction authors (1970).

That same year Reginald met Mary Wickizer Rogers, a student at Cal State. They married the following year and together formed the backbone of the publishing company into the 1990s.

Borgo Press specialized in literature and history, reflecting the interests of its owners. It published 300 titles from 1976 to 1998. 
In 2003 it started up again as an imprint of Wildside Press(Rockville, Maryland; John Gregory Betancourt, publisher), where Reginald has managed the imprint since 2006.

References

Citations

 Reginald, Robert (1970). Stella Nova: the contemporary science fiction authors. Los Angeles, CA: Unicorn & Son. 
 Reginald, Robert (1975). Contemporary science fiction authors, first edition. New York, NY: Arno Press. (Revised edition of Stella Nova)

External links
 "Measuring the Marigolds: The Fall and Rise of Borgo Press". May 24, 2003. Let a thousand flowers bloom (millefleurs.tv). Posted 2010-02-19. Archived 2011-10-01. Retrieved 2014-07-11.
 Wildside Press: Borgo (search report)

Publishing companies established in 1975
Publishing companies established in 2003
American companies established in 1975
Publishing companies of the United States